Col du Mont d'Orzeires (el. 1060 m.) is a high mountain pass in the Jura Mountains in the canton of Vaud in Switzerland.

The pass road runs on side road 152a from Le Pont (1008 m a.s.l.), a village in the municipality of L'Abbaye, northeast along lake Brenet, over the Col du Mont d'Orzeires, past Pierre Punex (1061 m a.s.l.) and continues to Chalêt du Mont d'Orzeires (1029  m a.s.l.), where the Juraparc animal park is located. After a few bends, the road runs from a height of 950  m a.s.l. to the east to La Dernier (764  m a.s.l.) and Vallorbe (749  m a.s.l.). The pass connects the Valle de Joux through the narrows between the Risoux range and the Dent de Vaulion (1483  m a.s.l.) with main road 9 near Vallorbe.

Tunnel 
The Pont–Vallorbe Railway (Chemin de fer Pont–Vallorbe) built a railway tunnel through the Mont d'Orzeires, which is traversed by trains on the Vallorbe–Le Brassus railway line. The tunnel was built in response to a petition from the residents of the valleys of 1867 and opened in 1886. It had a dual function, as it was not only serve the railway but, in the case of an extraordinary flood, it could also be used to empty water from the two lakes.

References

See also
 List of highest paved roads in Europe
 List of mountain passes
List of the highest Swiss passes

Mountain passes of Switzerland
Mountain passes of the Jura
Mountain passes of the canton of Vaud